20 Years of Narada Piano is a 2001 compilation release by Narada.  It peaked at #12 on Billboard's Top New Age album charts in the same year.

Track listing
1.1   "Endings" – Michael Jones – 5:33
1.2   "Sunrise" – Kostia – 5:02
1.3   "Dark Eyes" – Wayne Gratz – 4:07
1.4   "Beloved" – David Lanz – 3:39
1.5   "Water Circles" – Mia Jang – 4:40
1.6   "Minor Truths" – Fred Simon – 2:25
1.7   "Poetic Justice" – Sheila Larkin – 4:48
1.8   "Bethel" – Paul Cardall – 2:56
1.9   "Orcas"  – Michael Gettel – 3:49
1.10   "Jonathan's Lullaby" – Ira Stein – 4:54
1.11   "August 23, 1962" – Sheldon Mirowitz – 3:26
1.12   "Innocence" – Spencer Brewer – 2:57
1.13   "Watercolors" – Michael Gettel – 3:56
1.14   "Good Question" – Wayne Gratz – 2:33
1.15   "Flowers On The Water" – Kostia – 4:31
1.16   "La Source" – Ira Stein – 2:07
1.17   "Ghost Mountain" – Spencer Brewer – 4:47
2.1   "Before The Last Leaf Falls" – David Lanz – 3:26
2.2   "Diamonds For Stones" – Paul Cardall – 2:42
2.3   "First Light" – Michael Whalen – 2:33
2.4   "Evening" – Michael Jones – 5:07
2.5   "Aspens In January" – Michael Gettel – 7:23
2.6   "Lily Pond" – Mia Jang – 3:37
2.7   "Ever After" – Keiko Matsui – 5:44 (Additional performer – Bob James)
2.8   "Continuum" – Ira Stain – 3:06
2.9   "Sister Bay" – Fred Simon – 2:23
2.10   "Vesuvius" – David Lanz – 4:10
2.11   "First Kiss"  – David Arkenstone – 3:25
2.12   "The Glen" – Bradley Joseph – 4:07
2.13   "Turning" – Bob Read – 4:08
2.14   "Return To Love" – Michael Jones – 4:11
2.15   "Light And Darkening" – Allaudin Mathieu – 7:16
2.16   "Which Is Yes" – Spencer Brewer – 4:07
2.17   "Strawberry Fields Forever"  – David Lanz (Composers: Lennon–McCartney) – 3:53

See also
Grand Piano (Narada Anniversary Collection)
Narada Smooth Jazz
The Next Generation - Narada Sampler
Stories (Narada Artist Collection)
Narada Film and Television Music Sampler

References

External links
Listing at Narada.com
 
 20 Years of Narada Piano at Discogs
Review at Solo Piano Publications

2001 compilation albums
Instrumental compilation albums
Narada Productions compilation albums
New-age compilation albums
Easy listening compilation albums